Nordonia High School is a public high school in Macedonia, Ohio. It is the only high school in the Nordonia Hills City School District. Their mascot is a knight. There are approximately 1,300+ students currently  enrolled in the high school. The colors of the school are green and white.  Formerly of the Northeast Ohio Conference (NOC), Nordonia athletic teams now compete in the Suburban League.

Overview 
The school is the only high school in the Nordonia Hills City School District, which is located in northern Summit County, in between the cities of Akron and Cleveland. The district name is a portmanteau from the communities it primarily serves: Northfield and Northfield Center, Macedonia, and Sagamore Hills. The district also includes the northwestern section of adjacent Boston Heights.

State championships 

 Girls Bowling - 2023

 Boys Wrestling – 1977

Notable alumni 
 Mark Foster, musician and lead vocalist for the indie pop band Foster the People
 Kevin Kowalski, professional player in the National Football League (NFL)
 Daniel Letterle, actor
 Dylan Mabin, professional football player in the NFL
 Jordan Mabin, professional football player in the NFL
 Ron Sega, astronaut
 Rob Sims, professional football player in the NFL
 Jason Trusnik, professional football player in the NFL
 Denzel Ward, professional football player in the NFL
 Neil Zaza, musician

References

External links 
Nordonia High School
Nordonia Hills City School District

 

High schools in Summit County, Ohio
Public high schools in Ohio